Ports de Tortosa-Beseit, also known as Ports de Beseit, or simply as Els Ports  or Lo Port  by locals, is a limestone mountain massif located at the north-eastern end of the Sistema Ibérico, a complex system of mountain ranges and massifs in the centre of the Iberian Peninsula. Its highest point is Mont Caro, 1,441 m. Rivers such as the Matarranya and the Sénia have their source in these mountains.

Description
At the 1350 m high Tossal dels Tres Reis (Peak of the Three Kings), where the borders of the ancient Kingdoms of Valencia, Catalonia and Aragon meet, there is a cairn marking the meeting point of the ancient three kingdoms of the Crown of Aragon.

It is mostly a limestone massif, with many steep cliffs, jagged peaks, deep valleys, shafts and caves.
The area is mostly uninhabited except for small villages. These mountains were one of the last redoubts of the Spanish Maquis in the 1940s and 50s.

Ecology
One of the largest colonies of griffon vultures in Europe, as well as Spanish Ibex, Roe Deer, Wild Boar, European badgers, common genets, grey wagtails, among others, have their habitat in these lonely mountains. Among the aquatic animals there are trout in some of the rivers and amphibians such as the Marbled newt in many of the ponds of the range.

The vegetation of the Ports is rich and varied. Besides the Mediterranean species, there are also species belonging to Alpine flora and colder temperate regions at high altitudes and in protected valleys.

Mountain ranges
The Ports Massif comprises several mountain ranges, like the Muntanyes de Benifassà, Serra de les Falconeres, Serra del Àguila, Serra de Rastell, Los Curullons, Moles de Raudorar, Serra de la Fortalesa, Serra de Caro, Serra de la Puca, Serra de Rafalgari, Serra de Paüls, Serra de les Deveres, Serra de l'Escaleta, Serra d'Encanader, Serra del Pedregal, Serra del Coc and Serra de l'Espina. The latter, located at its northern end, connects with the Catalan Pre-Coastal Range.

Peaks
Some of the main peaks of the massif are: Mont Caro (1441 m), the highest point, Castell de l'Airosa, Tossal d'en Cervera, Mola del Boix, Mola del Boixet, el Castellar, la Portella del Pinell, Curullons, el Negrell, Punta de l'Àliga, Farrubio, Penyaflor, Mola de Catí, Tossal dels Tres Reis, Tossa Blanca, Roques de Benet, Penyagalera, Mola de Lli, Tossal de Tall Nou, Tossal de l'Espada, la Ballestera, Mola de la Paridera, Muntanyola, La Tossa, Mola Castellona, Tossal de Joan Gran, Tossal de la Forca, Tossal d'en Grillo, Muntanya de Santa Bàrbara, L'Espina and La Moleta d'Alfara.

Protected areas
There are two natural parks in the massif; there is no protected area on the Aragonese side:
Parc Natural dels Ports on the Catalan side
Parc Natural de la Tinença de Benifassà on the Valencian side.

See also
Beseit
Matarraña/Matarranya
Tinença de Benifassà
List of mountains in Aragon
List of mountains in the Valencian Community
List of mountains in Catalonia

Features

References

External links

Turisme a les Terres de l'Ebre
Parc Natural dels Ports
Lo Port
Walking trails through the natural park of Tinença de Benifassa

 
Mountain ranges of the Sistema Ibérico
Mountain ranges of Aragon
Mountain ranges of the Valencian Community
La Franja
Mountain ranges of Catalonia
Baix Maestrat